Jean-Joseph Rallier des Ourmes (26 May 1701 – 23 June 1771) was an 18th-century French mathematician.

The son of Julien François Rallier (1645–1709) and Marie de Baudouard († 1705), Rallier became "conseiller au présidial de Rennes" and worked on mathematical issues but also with agricultural problems.

His numerous writings are scattered in various collections, in particular in the Encyclopédie, where he provided 14 articles on arithmetics, and in the Mémoires des savants étrangers of the Académie des sciences.

He died, aged 70, in his château de la Rivière, near Vitré.

Works (selection) 
 Mémoire sur les quarrés magiques. In Mémoires de Mathématique et de Physique. Vol. 4, 1763, (p. 196–241).
 Usage des divisions d'un nombre pour résoudre un problème d'arithmetique. In: Mémoires de Mathématique et de Physique. Vol. 5, 1768, (p. 479–484).
 Methode facile pour découvir tous les nombres premiers contenus dans un cours illimité de la suite des impairs & tout d'un temps les diviseurs simples de ceux qui ne le font pas. In: Mémoires de Mathématique et de Physique. Vol. 5, 1768, (p. 485–499).
 Méthode nouvelle de division quand le dividende est multiple du diviseur, & d' extraction quand la puissance est parfaite. In: Mémoires de Mathématique et de Physique. Vol. 5, 1768, (p. 550–574).

Sources 
 Ferdinand Hoefer, Nouvelle Biographie générale, vol.37, Paris, Firmin-Didot, 1824, (p. 23–4).
 Pierre Larousse, Grand Dictionnaire universel du XIXe, vol.13, Paris, Administration du grand Dictionnaire universel, (p. 663).

External links 
 Jean-Joseph Rallier des Ourmes on Wikisource

18th-century French mathematicians
French agronomists
Contributors to the Encyclopédie (1751–1772)
French engineers
1701 births
People from Vitré, Ille-et-Vilaine
1771 deaths